Mesozercon is a genus of mites in the family Zerconidae. There is at least one described species in Mesozercon, M. plumatus.

References

Zerconidae
Articles created by Qbugbot